Bensemann is a surname. Notable people with the surname include:

Lawrence Bensemann (1891–1969), New Zealand professional rugby league footballer who played in the 1910s
Leo Bensemann, OBE (1912–1986), New Zealand artist, printer, typographer, publisher and editor
Walther Bensemann (1873–1934), German pioneer of football and founder of Kicker, the country's major sports publication

See also